Milan Hruška (born April 26, 1985) is a Slovak ice hockey defenceman. He currently plays for HC Topoľčany in the Slovak 1. Liga.

Hruška previously played in the Czech Extraliga for HC Kometa Brno, HC Vítkovice and BK Mladá Boleslav. He also played in the Slovak Extraliga for HK Nitra, HC Slovan Bratislava, HK Dukla Trenčín, and HC Nové Zámky.

Prior to turning professional, Hruška spent one season in the Quebec Major Junior Hockey League for the P.E.I. Rocket.

References

External links

1985 births
BK Mladá Boleslav players
HK Dukla Trenčín players
HC Kometa Brno players
Living people
HK Nitra players
HC Nové Zámky players
P.E.I. Rocket players
HC Slavia Praha players
SK Horácká Slavia Třebíč players
Slovak ice hockey defencemen
HC Slovan Bratislava players
HC Vítkovice players
Sportspeople from Topoľčany
Slovak expatriate ice hockey players in Canada
Slovak expatriate ice hockey players in the Czech Republic